David Michael Kemp (born 20 February 1953) is an English former professional football player and manager. He was assistant manager at Middlesbrough FC.

Playing career
Kemp began his career with Harrow Borough, subsequently playing for Maidenhead United and Slough Town before joining Crystal Palace in April 1975. He moved to Portsmouth in November 1976 and was their leading goalscorer in both the 1976–77 and 1977–78 seasons, despite not playing a full season for the club. A hugely popular player whilst at the club he even featured in Roy of the Rovers magazine photographed alongside his fictional goalscoring counterpart.

During the time he played for Pompey, a song was sung in his honour, to the tune of Lily The Pink. It is a song that is still sung today (2017). Kemp's reputation as a fans' favourite was further enhanced when he was inducted into the Portsmouth Hall of Fame in April 2016.

He moved to Carlisle United in March 1978, moving to Plymouth Argyle in September 1979 for a then club record fee of £75,000. He had loan spells with Gillingham (December 1981) and Brentford (March 1982), before joining NASL side Edmonton Drillers in June 1982. He spent the 1983 NASL season with Seattle Sounders and also played for San José Earthquakes before leaving the NASL in 1984 for the Oklahoma City Stampede of the short-lived United Soccer League (he accrued the 2nd-highest points total in the league).

Managerial career
Kemp then played for and was assistant manager of, Swedish side Hagahöjdens BK, Norrköping (22 matches, 14 goals). He returned to England in 1986, joining the coaching staff at Wimbledon. He was first team coach when Wimbledon won the FA Cup in 1988. He later took over as manager at Plymouth Argyle in March 1990.

In July 1992, he took over as manager of Conference side Slough Town. He guided Slough to fifth place in the Conference, their highest-ever finish, but left at the end of his first season to become assistant manager at Crystal Palace under new manager Alan Smith where they won the 1993–94 League Championship (and with it promotion to the Premier League), and reached the semi-finals of the League Cup and FA Cup in the 1994–95 season.

He was appointed as assistant manager of Wycombe Wanderers, again under Smith, at the start of the 1995–96 season, leaving along with Smith after a poor start to the 1996–97 season.

He then became assistant manager under John Docherty at Millwall and was later first-team coach at Wimbledon under Joe Kinnear until the summer of 1999 when he returned to Millwall as first-team coach. In December 1999, Kemp was appointed first-team coach at Portsmouth under new manager Tony Pulis.

In October 2000, he was appointed as manager of Oxford United, with Joe Kinnear as Director of Football. Kinnear left to manage Luton Town in February 2001 and Kemp was dismissed two months later following relegation and protests by the Oxford fans. In December 2001, he was appointed as Chief Scout for Leicester City. Later that month he was named as one of the best 101 players to have played for Plymouth Argyle before joining Stoke City as first-team coach in August 2004, again working under Tony Pulis. Kemp left Stoke in June 2005 when Pulis was dismissed.

In September 2005, Pulis took over as manager of Plymouth Argyle and again appointed Kemp as his assistant. Kemp remained in this post under new manager Ian Holloway until August 2006. In October 2006, he rejoined Stoke City as assistant manager, but became chief scout when Peter Reid was appointed as assistant manager. In July 2010, Reid left Stoke to become manager at Plymouth and Pulis again appointed Kemp as his assistant. Kemp remained as assistant to Pulis as Stoke earned automatic promotion to the Premier League in 2008. Stoke established themselves as a Premier League outfit during Kemp's time as assistant and finished as runners-up in the 2011 FA Cup. He left Stoke at the end of the 2012–13 season. He followed Pulis to Crystal Palace in January 2014 and then West Bromwich Albion in January 2015. Kemp left his position as Albion's Assistant Head Coach at the end of the 2016–17 season and retired from football after spending more than 40 years in the game. After a short break Kemp returned to football with Middlesbrough.

Career statistics

References

External links
 
 NASL stats
 Wimbledon stats at AFCW

1953 births
Living people
Brentford F.C. players
English expatriate sportspeople in Sweden
Carlisle United F.C. players
Chicago Sting (NASL) players
Crystal Palace F.C. players
Crystal Palace F.C. non-playing staff
Edmonton Drillers (1979–1982) players
English expatriate footballers
English expatriate sportspeople in Canada
English expatriate sportspeople in the United States
English football managers
English footballers
Expatriate soccer players in Canada
Expatriate soccer players in the United States
Association football forwards
Gillingham F.C. players
Harrow Borough F.C. players
Maidenhead United F.C. players
Middlesbrough F.C. non-playing staff
North American Soccer League (1968–1984) indoor players
North American Soccer League (1968–1984) players
Oklahoma City Stampede players
Oxford United F.C. managers
Footballers from Harrow, London
Plymouth Argyle F.C. managers
Plymouth Argyle F.C. players
Plymouth Argyle F.C. non-playing staff
Portsmouth F.C. players
Seattle Sounders (1974–1983) players
Slough Town F.C. managers
Slough Town F.C. players
English Football League players
Tulsa Roughnecks (1978–1984) players
United Soccer League (1984–85) players
Stoke City F.C. non-playing staff
West Bromwich Albion F.C. non-playing staff
Wimbledon F.C. players